Viktor Rašović (born 13 August 1993) is a Serbian water polo centre back of the Serbia men's national water polo team and Noisy-le-Sec.

Honours

Club 
VK Crvena zvezda
 National Championship of Serbia: 2012–13, 2013–14
 National Cup of Serbia: 2012–13, 2013–14
 2012–13 LEN Champions League
 2013 LEN Super Cup

CN Atlètic-Barceloneta
 2015–16 División de Honor de Waterpolo

VK Jug
 National Championship of Croatia: 2017-18 
 National Cup of Croatia: 2017-18
 Adriatic Water Polo League: 2017-18
Szolnok 
National Championship of Hungary: 2020–21 
2020–21 LEN Eurocup

See also
 List of World Aquatics Championships medalists in water polo

References

External links
 

Living people
1993 births
Sportspeople from Belgrade
Serbian male water polo players
European champions for Serbia
Mediterranean Games gold medalists for Serbia
Mediterranean Games medalists in water polo
Competitors at the 2013 Mediterranean Games
Competitors at the 2018 Mediterranean Games
Universiade medalists in water polo
Universiade gold medalists for Serbia
Medalists at the 2017 Summer Universiade
21st-century Serbian people